Llandovery Hospital is a community hospital in Llandovery, Wales. It is managed by the Hywel Dda University Health Board.

History
The hospital has its origins in the Llandovery Union Workhouse and Infirmary which was established in 1838. It became a Public Assistance Institution in 1930 and joined the National Health Service as a children's home in 1948 before becoming a community hospital in the 1960s. More recently it established a rehabilitation unit for elderly patients.

References

NHS hospitals in Wales
Hospitals in Carmarthenshire
Hospitals established in 1838
Hospital buildings completed in 1838
Llandovery
Hywel Dda University Health Board